Hoseynabad-e Sarab (also Romanized as Ḩoseynābād-e Sarāb and Ḩoseynābād Sarāb) is a village in Beyza Rural District, Beyza District, Sepidan County, Fars Province, Iran. At the 2006 census, its population was 292, in 65 families.

References 

Populated places in Beyza County